La Tribune is the name of the following newspapers:

 La Tribune French financial paper, largest of these
 La Tribune (Algeria), Algerian newspaper
 La Tribune de Genève, Swiss newspaper
 La Tribune des départements, defunct French newspaper that ran from 1829 to 1835
 La Tribune (Sherbrooke), Québécois newspaper founded in Sherbrooke in 1910
 Tribune de Lyon, Lyonnais newspaper sometimes called La Tribune

See also
 Tribune (disambiguation)
 The Tribune (disambiguation)
 La Tribuna (disambiguation)